Loxodromic navigation (from Greek λοξóς, oblique, and δρóμος, path) is a method of navigation by following a rhumb line, a curve on the surface of the Earth that follows the same angle at the intersection with each meridian. This serves to maintain a steady course in sailing.

Navigating on a spherical surface with a fixed course ( in the figure) results in a spiral path that approaches the North Pole for courses ranging from 270º to 090º and the South Pole for courses from 090º to 270º. On a nautical chart plotted according to the Mercator projection, a loxodromic course appears as a straight line.

Comparison Chart

See also 
 Great circle navigation
 Windrose network
 Map
 Portolan map
 Marine sandglass
 Compass rose
 Isoazimuthal

References

http://journals.cambridge.org/action/displayAbstract?fromPage=online&aid=6233256

External links 
 algorithms/ assistance program for loxodromic navigation

Navigation
Spherical curves